Chencho Dorji (born 1 January 1980 in Mongar) is a Bhutanese football manager, who most recently, at the senior level, coached Indian club Sudeva Delhi FC in the I-League. Besides Bhutan, he has managed in India.

Managerial career
Dorji completed his C-License coaching course in 2005 when he was still just 25. In the 12 years that he worked with the Bhutan Football Federation (BFF) after that, he enrolled in every programme that he came across, just to learn more about the game. Such was his hunger for footballing knowledge that upon finishing all of BFF’s courses, he went to Japan and completed all the coaching courses from there as well. Football in Bhutan benefited from it as he served a number of different age-group teams over the years besides playing an important role in setting up their grassroots system.

Dorji had earlier worked as the head coach of the Bhutan youth national teams and he was always wanting to move to Indian I-League. "The I-League is one of the biggest leagues in South Asia and it has teams that have been playing at such a high level for many years. We have been preparing well and no team should take us lightly. We can certainly come up with surprise results," Dorji said about his move to Sudeva.

Bracing up for their maiden I-League appearance, Sudeva Delhi FC appointed Dorji as the team's head coach ahead of the upcoming season. I-League's newest entrant is the first team from national capital New Delhi.

Dorji is the first Bhutanese coach at the helm of any club in the history of the I-League.
He joined Sudeva's academy in November 2019 and is now the chief tactician of the senior team. Dorji has previously worked at the Bhutan Football Federation for 12 years.

The first club from the national capital to play in the I-League, Sudeva Delhi FC have opted for an all-Indian squad in their first season and the concept was came from Dorji's mind. He said that "The message was always clear that we will go with an all-Indian squad."

Statistics

Managerial statistics
.

References

External links
Chencho Dorji Profile at www.bhutanfootball.org

Bhutanese football managers
Living people
1980 births
Bhutanese expatriate sportspeople in India
I-League managers
Sudeva Delhi FC managers
Bhutan national football team managers